Tracy O'Neil Porter  (born August 11, 1986) is a former American football cornerback. He was drafted by the New Orleans Saints in the second round of the 2008 NFL Draft. Porter is best known for being a crucial player during the 2009 New Orleans Saints season, in which he famously intercepted Brett Favre in the NFC Championship Game and won Super Bowl XLIV, sealing the game with an interception returned for a touchdown. He played college football at Indiana.

Porter also played for the Denver Broncos, Oakland Raiders, Washington Redskins, and Chicago Bears.

Early years
Porter attended Port Allen High School, where he played quarterback, running back, wide receiver, and cornerback. He earned first team All-District 3A honors in his first year of organized football as a junior and second-team as a senior after recording 93 tackles, 11 interceptions (two returned for touchdowns) and 14 pass breakups. He also returned two punts and two kickoffs each for touchdowns, averaging 47.0 yards per kick return and 28.0 per punt return.

In addition to football, Porter was also a starter at point guard for the basketball team and a sprinter on the track & field, where he posted a personal-best time of 10.4 seconds in the 100-meter dash.

College career
Porter played college football for the Indiana University Hoosiers from 2004-2007. During his senior year, he earned All-Big Ten Conference first-team. He finished his career second in Indiana Hoosiers history with 16 career interceptions and first in interception yards with 413. He also became the first player in school history to return a punt, interception and fumble for touchdowns in his career. He finished his career with 212 tackles and 16 interceptions.

Professional career
Porter attended the NFL Combine in Indianapolis and completed all of the combine and positional drills. He impressed scouts with his 40-yard dash and tied for tenth among all players at the combine. He also had the fourth best time in the short shuttle and 60-yard shuttle. On March 5, 2008, Porter participated at Indiana's pro day and chose to run the 40-yard dash (4.38s), 20-yard dash (2.51s), and 10-yard dash (1.46s). At the conclusion of the pre-draft process, Porter was projected to a third round pick by NFL draft experts and scouts. He ranked as the 12th best cornerback prospect in the draft by DraftScout.com.

New Orleans Saints
Porter was drafted by the New Orleans Saints in the second round of the  2008 NFL Draft. On June 25, 2008, the New Orleans Saints signed Porter to a four-year, $4.20 million contract.

He played in five games during his rookie season before being placed on injured reserve after dislocating his wrist.

Late in the fourth quarter of the Saints' come-from-behind win in Week 7 of their 2009 season, Porter intercepted Miami Dolphins quarterback Chad Henne on fourth and long; his 54-yard return resulted in a touchdown, sealing their win. Midway through the fourth quarter of the NFC Championship game on January 24, 2010, with the Minnesota Vikings already in the red zone and driving towards a score, Porter punched the ball out of the hands of Vikings wide receiver Bernard Berrian; the fumble was recovered by the Saints.  Later, with less than a minute left in regulation, and the Vikings almost within range of a game-winning field goal, Porter intercepted a pass from Vikings quarterback Brett Favre, sending the game to overtime.  The Saints later prevailed with a final score of 31-28.

Late in the fourth quarter of Super Bowl XLIV against the Indianapolis Colts with the Colts in Saints' territory, Porter jumped Colts wide receiver Reggie Wayne's route and intercepted Peyton Manning's pass, returning it 74-yards for a touchdown. The score ended the Colts' hopes of a comeback and sealed New Orleans' first Super Bowl victory. In interviews after the game, Porter credited his pick to film study of the Colts' season. "I'd seen it over and over -- third down," Porter said. "That was a big route for them to convert on. I made the break on it, and here comes the end zone."

In the aftermath of the Super Bowl win, Porter was honored by his home town, Port Allen, which first jokingly renamed the city "Porter Allen" for a day in his honor, then later named a street after him.

Denver Broncos
On March 22, 2012, Porter signed a one-year, $4 million contract with the Denver Broncos. In his first game as a Bronco, Porter returned an interception off Pittsburgh Steelers' quarterback Ben Roethlisberger for a touchdown to seal the Broncos' opening day victory. He then won the AFC Defensive Player of the Week award for his performance. However, prior to the Broncos' Week 6 game at the San Diego Chargers, he experienced aftereffects from a seizure that he suffered during the preseason. Porter returned to practice on a limited basis over the next several weeks, and later returned to game action late in the regular season, only to suffer a concussion and miss the playoffs.

Oakland Raiders
On April 1, 2013, the Oakland Raiders signed Porter to a one-year, $1.5 million contract. In a game against the New York Giants on November 10, 2013, he became the first player in NFL history to return an interception for a touchdown against both Peyton and Eli Manning.

Washington Redskins
On March 13, 2014, Porter was signed by the Washington Redskins to a two-year, $6.25 million contract. he was placed on injured reserve on November 26, 2014, due to a shoulder injury. On May 27, 2015, he was released.

Chicago Bears
On June 8, 2015, Porter signed a one-year, $870,000 free agent contract with the Chicago Bears. In a Thanksgiving Day victory over the Green Bay Packers, Porter became the first player to break up four of Packers quarterback Aaron Rodgers' passes in a game. He also recorded his first interception as a Bear in the game. Porter ended the season with 22 pass breakups, which led the Bears.

On March 9, 2016, the Bears signed Porter to a three-year, $12 million contract with $4.25 million guaranteed and a signing bonus of $900,000.

On April 10, 2017, Porter was released by the Bears after they had signed free agents Prince Amukamara and Marcus Cooper.

NFL statistics

Key
 G: games played
 GS: games started
 Comb: combined tackles
 Total: total tackles
 Ast: assisted tackles
 Sack: sacks
 FF: forced fumbles
 FR: fumble recoveries
 Yds: yards 
 INT: interceptions
 AVG IR: average interception return
 Lng: longest interception return
 TD: interceptions returned for touchdown
 PD: passes defensed

References

External links
Washington Redskins bio
Oakland Raiders bio
New Orleans Saints bio
Indiana Hoosiers bio

1986 births
Living people
People from Port Allen, Louisiana
Players of American football from Louisiana
American football cornerbacks
Indiana Hoosiers football players
New Orleans Saints players
Denver Broncos players
Oakland Raiders players
Washington Redskins players
Chicago Bears players